The leader of His Majesty's Loyal Opposition in Newfoundland and Labrador is a title traditionally held by the leader of the largest party not in government in the Newfoundland and Labrador House of Assembly.  
This list is incomplete

References

Politics of Newfoundland and Labrador
Newfoundland
Members of the Newfoundland and Labrador House of Assembly
Newfoundland and Labrador politics-related lists